See:

 John Lander
 Richard Lander